John Charles Glover (born 29 August 1989) is a Welsh cricketer. Glover is a right-handed batsman who bowls right-arm medium-fast. He was born in Cardiff, Glamorgan and educated at Llantarnam School in Cwmbran.

While studying for his degree at Durham University, Glover made his first-class debut for Durham UCCE against Derbyshire in 2008. He appeared in seven further first-class matches for the university, the last of which was in 2010 against Durham, by which time the university was playing as Durham MCCU following a change of name for the 2010 season. In his seven first-class matches, he took 15 wickets at an average of 40.06, with best figures of 5/38. These figures, his only five wicket haul in first-class cricket, came against Durham in 2009.

Glover plays county cricket for Wales Minor Counties, making his debut for the team in the 2008 season against Berkshire in the Minor Counties Championship. He continues to play minor counties cricket for Wales Minor Counties, as well as having played for the Glamorgan Second XI. Toward the end of the 2011 season, Glover made his debut for Glamorgan in a first-class match against Gloucestershire in the County Championship at the County Ground, Bristol. He made two further first-class appearances in that season for the county, against Middlesex and Kent. In the 2012 season, he has made seven first-class appearances in the County Championship, as well as making his List A debut against Surrey at the SWALEC Stadium in the 2012 Clydesdale Bank 40.

Glover signed a new two-year contract with Glamorgan in August 2012 which will take him to the end of the 2014 season.

Career best performances
as of 29 September 2013

References

External links
John Glover at ESPNcricinfo
John Glover at CricketArchive

1989 births
Living people
Cricketers from Cardiff
Welsh cricketers
Durham MCCU cricketers
Wales National County cricketers
Glamorgan cricketers
21st-century Welsh people
Alumni of St Aidan's College, Durham